Virðisbrævamarknaður Føroya (the Faroese Securities Market) was founded in 2000; the technical operator for the market is the Iceland Stock Exchange.

References

External links
 Virðisbrævamarknaður Føroya

Financial markets
Financial services companies established in 2000
Organizations based in the Faroe Islands
Nasdaq exchanges
Nasdaq Nordic
Stock exchanges in Europe